Azerbaijan Province may refer to:
 West Azerbaijan Province, Iran
 East Azerbaijan Province, Iran

See also 
 Azerbaijan (disambiguation)

Province name disambiguation pages